Social network is a theoretical concept in the social sciences, particularly Sociology and Anthropology, referring to a social structure made up of individuals or organizations. It may also refer to:

Internet-related
 Community network, a term used broadly to indicate the use of networking technologies by, and for, a local community
 Social networking service, online sites to connect people with similar interests
 Distributed social network, an Internet social networking service that is decentralized and distributed across different providers
 Social network game, online games where many people can play at once
 Social networking websites, a list of major active social networking websites and excludes dating websites (see Comparison of online dating services)
 Social network aggregation, the process of collecting content from multiple social networking services
 Social network automation,  tools that are used to semi/automate the process of posting content to social networking and social bookmarking websites
 Social media
 Social media marketing, marketing and advertising practices with Internet-based applications
 Social networking spam, spam directed at users of internet social networking services

Business-related
 Enterprise social networking, focuses on the use of online social networks or social relations among people who share business interests and/or activities.
 Professional network service, (or, in an internet context, simply a professional network) is a type of social network service that is focused solely on interactions and relationships of a business nature
 Business networking, is an activity in which groups of like-minded business people recognize, create, or act upon business opportunities

Movie
 The Social Network, 2010 docudrama film about the founding of Facebook

Other
 Scientific collaboration network, how scientists work together across social networks

See also
 Networking (disambiguation), which also covers network